Royal Gorge Cross Country Ski Resort is claimed to be the largest cross-country ski resort in North America.

Royal Gorge Resort offers accommodations and dining locations.   Rainbow Lodge is a beautiful historic lodge that dates back to the 19th century, remotely located right by the Yuba River.

References

External links
official Royal Gorge XC Ski Resort website

Ski areas and resorts in California
Buildings and structures in Nevada County, California
Yuba River
Tourist attractions in Nevada County, California